Kowloon Hospital is a general care hospital located in Kowloon City District, in Kowloon, Hong Kong. The complex was built on land between Argyle Street and Prince Edward Road.

The hospital used to be an acute hospital with accident and emergency service. It was later converted to a chronic hospital to provide extended supportive care to patients from Queen Elizabeth Hospital. The hospital has specialist services in psychiatry, rehabilitation, respiratory medicine and geriatrics. The respiratory medicine unit provides teaching opportunities for medical students from the Li Ka Shing Faculty of Medicine, University of Hong Kong.

With 1,281 beds, the hospital was the first to establish a rehabilitation unit in Hong Kong.

References

External links

Hospitals in Hong Kong
Hospitals in Kowloon City District
Grade II historic buildings in Hong Kong
Grade III historic buildings in Hong Kong
Hospitals established in 1925